The following lists events that happened during 2020 in the Republic of Nauru.

Incumbents 

 President: Lionel Aingimea
 Speaker of Parliament: Marcus Stephen

Events 
Ongoing – COVID-19 pandemic in Oceania
 31 January – Nauru establishes diplomatic relations with Kyrgyzstan.
 6 July – Despite there being no reported cases of COVID-19, the government declared a national emergency as a preventive measure, suspending all but one weekly flight to the country and instituting a 14-day quarantine for all arrivals.
 14 September – It was announced that President Lionel Aingimea and the leaders of Kiribati, Palau, the Federated States of Micronesia and the Marshall Islands will be hosting an in-person meeting. President Lionel Aingimea said the leaders agreed to attend Palau's Independence Day on October 1 as the five Pacific countries remain free of COVID-19.

Deaths

References 

 
2020s in Nauru
Years of the 21st century in Nauru
Nauru
Nauru